Traddles may refer to:

Tommy Traddles, a fictional character in the 1850 Charles Dickens novel David Copperfield and its 1969 film adaptation; see David Copperfield (novel), David Copperfield (1969 film), and List of Dickensian characters
, a United States Navy patrol boat acquired in 1917 but never commissioned